Matthew Arthur Grootegoed (born  May 6, 1982) is a former American college and professional football player who was a linebacker in the National Football League (NFL) and Canadian Football League (CFL).  He played college football for the University of Southern California, and was recognized as an All-American.  He was signed by the NFL's Detroit Lions as an undrafted free agent in 2005, and also played for the CFL's Calgary Stampeders in 2009.

Early years
Grootegoed was born in Huntington Beach, California.  He attended Mater Dei High School in Santa Ana, California, with Matt Leinart.  The Mater Dei Monarch Lions high school football team won three California Interscholastic Federation (CIF) championships while he was a member.

As a junior in 1998, he rushed for more than 1,600 yards with twenty-one touchdowns on offense, and made 130 tackles, six forced fumbles and three interceptions on defense.  In the CIF Division I championship game, which Mater Dei won, he earned Offensive and Defensive Player of the Game honors (he ran for 244 yards, with a 7.4 average, and two touchdowns).  Following the season, he was selected as a Student Sports Junior All-American, Cal-Hi All-State first-team, All-CIF Southern Section first-team, All-CIF Division I Defensive Most Valuable Player (MVP), Los Angeles Times All-Orange County Back of the Year and Orange County Register All-Orange County Defensive MVP.

During his 1999 senior season, he made 138 tackles, six interceptions (including two touchdown returns), seven tackles for losses and two forced fumbles as a free safety, and ran for 945 yards on 116 carries with fourteen touchdowns as a running back.  He also played quarterback early in the season, completing 21 of 41 passes for 300-plus yards.  Afterward, he was selected for the USA Today All-USA first-team, Parade All-American, Super Prep All-American, Prep Star All-American, ESPN All-American, Cal-Hi Sports All-State first-team, All-CIF Southern Section first-team, and received the All-CIF Division I Defensive MVP Award, Los Angeles Times Glenn Davis Award, Los Angeles Times All-Orange County first-team, Orange County Register All-Orange County Defensive MVP and All-Serra League MVP.

College career
Grootegoed received an athletic scholarship to attend the University of Southern California, where he was a four-year starter for coach Pete Carroll's USC Trojans football team from 2000 to 2004.  After redshirting as a true freshman in 2000, he earned a spot in the Trojans' starting line-up.  Carroll said of him "Things just happen when he's on the field.  He knocks the ball down, knocks the ball loose, forces plays in the backfield and makes plays getting off blocks.  You can't hold him down."  While Grootegoed played for the Trojans, the team won three straight Pacific-10 Conference championships (2002, 2003, 2004) and two consecutive Associated Press (AP) national championships in 2003 and 2004.  He was a second-team All-Pac-10 selection in 2003.  Following his senior season in 2004, he was a finalist for the Butkus Award, and was recognized as a first-team All-Pac-10 selection and a consensus first-team All-American.

Professional career

National Football League
On April 26, 2005, Grootegoed was signed as an undrafted free agent by the Tampa Bay Buccaneers following the 2005 NFL Draft, eventually released to their practice squad, and was later picked up by the Detroit Lions.  Grootegoed played for the Lions in the final three games of their  season.

Canadian Football League
The Stampeders released Grootegoed on September 9, 2009.

References

Living people
1982 births
American football linebackers
American players of Canadian football
Canadian football linebackers
Calgary Stampeders players
Detroit Lions players
Tampa Bay Buccaneers players
USC Trojans football players
All-American college football players
Sportspeople from Huntington Beach, California
Players of American football from California